Graham Matthews (born 2 November 1942) is an English former footballer who played in the Football League for Crewe Alexandra, Stoke City and Walsall.

Career
Matthews was born in Newcastle-under-Lyme and joined his local club Stoke City in 1960. He played twice in 1960–61 and made twelve appearances in 1961–62 scoring twice. Unfortunately for Matthews in October 1961 Stoke manager Tony Waddington brought the legendary Stanley Matthews back to the club. Matthews had no hope of retaining his place in the side at the expense of someone like the former England international and he left for Walsall in 1963.

He spent two seasons at Fellows Park where he made 73 appearances scoring 22 goals before joining Crewe Alexandra in 1965. He played 61 times for the "Railwaymen" scoring 19 goals and helped the team finish in 5th position in the Fourth Division in 1966–67.

Career statistics
Source:

References

External links
 

English footballers
Crewe Alexandra F.C. players
Stoke City F.C. players
Walsall F.C. players
English Football League players
1942 births
Living people
Sportspeople from Newcastle-under-Lyme
Association football forwards